Tania, the Woman Che Guevara Loved is the English translation of a book by  José Antonio Friedl Zapata, about Haydée Tamara Bunke Bider (November 19, 1937 – August 31, 1967), better known as Tania or Tania the Guerrilla, who was a communist revolutionary and spy who played a prominent role in the Cuban government after the Cuban Revolution and in various Latin American revolutionary movements. She was the only woman to fight alongside Bolivian Marxist rebels under the command of Che Guevara.

It was published first  in German  as Tania : die Frau, die Che Guevera liebte in 1997, and then in Spanish as  Tania la guerrillera : la enigmática espía a la sombra del Che in 1999 .

References

 
1997 non-fiction books
Books about Che Guevara